Copper(II) lactate, also referred to as cupric lactate, is the chemical compound with the formula Cu(C3H5O3)2. It is a green powder that readily dissolves in hot water to form a green solution, often more blue than the acetate.

Preparation 
Copper(II) lactate can be prepared by heating copper(II) oxide with lactic acid. The reaction does not usually go to completion, and excess reactants must be removed from the product.

Bibliography

Copper compounds
Lactates